The 1969 Ice Hockey World Championships was the 36th edition of the Ice Hockey World Championships, which also doubled as the 47th European ice hockey championships. For the first time the Pool A, B and C tournaments were hosted by different nations:

Pool A in Stockholm, Sweden, 15–30 March 1969
Pool B in Ljubljana, Yugoslavia, 28 February – 9 March 1969
Pool C in Skopje, Yugoslavia, 24 February – 2 March 1969

A total of 20 nations participated in the tournament. The Pool A team featured only the top six nations, now playing a double round-robin tournament for the amateur world championship. Teams #7-#14 contested the Pool B championship with the winner qualifying for the 1970 Pool A championship, while the bottom six participated in the Pool C tournament.  Pool B and C began exchanging two teams this year (through promotion and relegation), a practice that lasted until 1987.

World Championship Group A (Sweden)
For the seventh straight year, the Soviet Union won the Pool A tournament. Originally the tournament was scheduled to be held in Czechoslovakia, but due to the Soviet invasion of the country, they declined to host. In the two games the Czechoslovak and Soviet teams played against each other, the Czechoslovak team won both times, becoming the first team to beat the Soviet Union twice in the same international tournament. For the first time in international ice hockey, body-checking was allowed in all three zones of the ice. Team USA was demoted to Pool-B after losing all ten games.

 – 	6:1  (1:0, 2:1, 3:0)

15. March 1969 – Stockholm
Goalscorers: Suchý 2, Nedomanský, Jiří Holík, Ševčík, Horešovský – King.
Referees: Wiking, Dahlberg (SWE)

 –   6:3 (3:1, 1:1, 2:1)

15. March 1969 – Stockholm
Goalscorers: Lundström 2, Henriksson 2, Sterner, Nilsson - J. Peltonen, Keinonen, Isaksson.

 –   17:2 (3:0, 11:0, 3:2)

15. March 1969 – Stockholm
Goalscorers: Starshinov 4, Firsov 4, Mikhailov 3, Yurzinov 2, Paladiev, Maltsev, Petrov, Mishakov - Lackey 2.

 –   5:1 (1:1, 1:0, 3:0)

16. March 1969 – Stockholm
Goalscorers: Caffery 2, Pinder, Bourbonnais, Huck - Keinonen.

 –   2:4 (2:1, 0:1, 0:2)

16. March 1969 – Stockholm
Goalscorers: Nilsson, Johansson – Starshinov, Maltsev, Mikhailov, Kharlamov.

 – 	8:3   (2:1, 4:2, 2:0)

16. March 1969 – Stockholm
Goalscorers: Nedomanský 2, Jar. Holík 2, Farda, Suchý, Hrbatý, Golonka – Lackey, Christiansen, Stordahl.
Referees: Dahlberg (SWE), Vaillancourt (CAN)

 –  	7:4  (4:1, 3:1, 0:2)

18. March 1969 - Stockholm
Goalscorers: Machač 3, Nedomanský 2, Suchý, Jiří Holík – Rantasila 2, Partinen, Mononen.
Referees: Joyal, Villancourt (CAN)

 –    8:2 (1:2, 3:0, 4:0)

18. March 1969 - Stockholm
Goalscorers: Sterner 2, Carlsson, Milton, Karlsson,  Johansson, Lundström, Olsson - Markle, Pleau.

 –   7:1 (5:1, 2:0, 0:0)

18. March 1969 - Stockholm
Goalscorers: Vikulov 2, Firsov 2, Kharlamov 2, Yakushev - Pinder.

 -  6:1 (3:0, 1:0, 2:1)

19. March 1969 - Stockholm
Goalscorers: Petrov 2, Paladiev, Maltsev, Firsov, Kharlamov - Oksanen.

 -  	0:2   (0:1, 0:0, 0:1)

19. March 1969 - Stockholm
Goalscorers: Palmqvist, Nilsson.
Referees: Trumble (USA), Joyal (CAN)

 –    5:0 (1:0, 0:0, 4:0)

20. March 1969 - Stockholm
Goalscorers: Hargreaves, Caffery, Bayes, King, Huck.

 –  5:1 (1:1, 3:0, 1:0)

21. March 1969 - Stockholm
Goalscorers: Lundström 2, Svedberg, Sjöberg, Johansson - Caffery.

 -   2:0   (0:0, 1:0, 1:0)

21. March 1969 - Stockholm
Goalscorers: 33. Suchý, 47. Černý.
Referees: Dahlberg (SWE), Vaillancourt (CAN)

 –    4:3 (1:1, 1:0, 2:2)

22. March 1969 – Stockholm
Goalscorers: E. Peltonen 2, Leimu, Wahlsten - Pleau, Mayasich, Sheehy.

 –   4:8 (1:3, 1:2, 2:3)

23. March 1969 - Stockholm
Goalscorers: Mayasich 2, Skime, Naslund - Mishakov 2, Paladiev, Firsov, Mikhailov, Petrov, Kharlamov, Yurzinov.

 –   5:0 (2:0, 2:0, 1:0)

23. March 1969 – Stockholm
Goalscorers: Karlsson 3, Sjöberg, Johansson.

 - 	3:2   (1:1, 1:0, 1:1)

23. March 1969 - Stockholm
Goalscorers: Golonka, Hrbatý, Jar. Holík – Heindl, Bayes.
Referees: Dahlberg (SWE), Trumble (USA)

 –   2:3 (1:1, 1:1, 0:1)

24. March 1969 – Stockholm
Goalscorers: Sjöberg, Nygren - Mikhailov 2, Petrov.

 -  	4:2   (2:2, 1:0, 1:0)

25. March 1969 - Stockholm
Goalscorers: Jiřík 2, Jiří Holík, Nedomanský – Keinonen, Isaksson.
Referees: Wiking (SWE), Trumble (USA)

  -   0:1 (0:1, 0:0, 0:0)

25. March 1969 - Stockholm
Goalscorer: Mott.

 -  3:7 (0:1, 1:4, 2:2)

26. March 1969 - Stockholm
Goalscorers: Leimu, Isaksson, Oksanen – Paladiev, Zimin, Starshinov, Maltsev, Petrov,  Firsov, Mishakov

 - 	6:2   (2:0, 2:1, 2:1)

26. March 1969 - Stockholm
Goalscorers: Nedomanský 2, Černý 2, Pospíšil, Machač – Pieau, Skime.
Referees: Sillankorva (FIN), Vaillancourt (CAN)

 –  4:2 (1:0, 0:2, 3:0)

27. March 1969 - Stockholm
Goalscorers: Sterner 2, Johansson, Håkan Nygren – Pinder, Heindl.

 -  	4:3   (2:0, 0:2, 2:1)

28. March 1969 - Stockholm
Goalscorers: 15. Jiří Holík, 20. Nedomanský, 49. Horešovský, 51. Jar. Holík – 22. Kharlamov, 33. Firsov, 58. Ragulin.
Referees: Dahlberg (SWE), Vaillancourt (CAN)

 –  1:6 (0:3, 1:2, 0:1)

29. March 1969 – Stockholm
Goalscorers: Mononen - King, Stephanson, Heindl, Begg, Mott, Huck.

 –   10:4 (6:2, 1:1, 3:1)

29. March 1969 – Stockholm
Goalscorers: Milton 3, Nilsson 3, Karlsson, Johansson, Nygren, Olsson - Lackey, Pleau, Stordahl, Gambucci.

 –  3:7 (1:1, 0:5, 2:1)

30. March 1969 - Stockholm
Goalscorers: Pleau, Stordahl, Christiansen - Rantasila 2, J. Peltonen 2, Leimu,  Harju, E. Peltonen.

 –  	0:1   (0:1, 0:0, 0:0)

30. March 1969 – Stockholm
Goalscorer: 18. Olsson.
Referees: Trumble (USA), Vaillancourt (CAN)

 –   2:4 (1:1, 0:1, 1:2)

30. March 1969 – Stockholm
Goalscorers: Demarco, Heindl - Mikhailov 2, Romishevsky, Maltsev.

Pool A Statistics and team rosters

1. 
Goaltenders: Viktor Zinger, Viktor Puchkov.
Defencemen: Vitali Davydov, Igor Romishevsky, Alexander Ragulin, Vladimir Lutchenko, Yevgeni Paladiev, Viktor Kuzkin.
Forwards: Vladimir Vikulov, Alexander Maltsev, Anatoli Firsov, Boris Mikhailov, Vladimir Petrov, Valeri Kharlamov, Yevgeni Zimin, Viacheslav Starshinov, Alexander Yakushev, Yevgeni Mishakov, Vladimir Yurzinov.
Coaches: Arkady Chernyshev, Anatoli Tarasov.

2. 
Goaltenders: Leif Holmqvist, Gunnar Bäckman.
Defencemen: Lennart Svedberg, Arne Carlsson, Bert-Ola Nordlander, Lars-Erik Sjöberg, Nils Johansson, Kjell-Rune Milton.
Forwards: Stig-Göran Johansson, Stefan Karlsson, Tord Lundström, Ulf Sterner, Lars-Göran Nilsson, Björn Palmqvist, Håkan Nygren, Mats Hysing, Dick Yderström, Roger Olsson, Leif Henriksson.
Coach: Arne Strömberg.

3. 
Goaltenders: Vladimír Dzurilla, Miroslav Lacký.
Defencemen: Jan Suchý, Josef Horešovský, Oldřich Machač, František Pospíšil, Vladimír Bednář.
Forwards: František Ševčík, Jozef Golonka, Jaroslav Jiřík, Jan Hrbatý, Jaroslav Holík, Jiří Holík, Richard Farda, Václav Nedomanský, Josef Černý, Jan Klapáč, Jan Havel, Josef Augusta.
Coaches: Jaroslav Pitner, Vladimír Kostka.

4. 
Goaltenders: Wayne Stephenson, Ken Dryden.
Defencemen: Gary Begg, Terry O'Malley, Ken Stephanson, Jack Bownass, Bob Murdoch, Ab DeMarco, Jr.
Forwards: Gerry Pinder, Fran Huck, Morris Mott, Richie Bayes, Terry Caffery, Steve King, Chuck Lefley, Roger Bourbonnais, Ted Hargreaves, Bill Heindl, Danny O'Shea
Coach: Jackie McLeod.

5. 
Goaltenders: Urpo Ylönen, Lasse Kiili.
Defencemen: Seppo Lindström, Lalli Partinen, Juha Rantasila, Ilpo Koskela, Pekka Marjamäki.
Forwards: Lasse Oksanen, Juhani Wahlsten, Matti Keinonen, Esa Peltonen, Jorma Peltonen, Pekka Leimu, Lauri Mononen, Esa Isaksson, Juhani Jylhä, Veli-Pekka Ketola, Matti Harju, Kari Johansson.
Coaches: Gustav Bubnik and Seppo Liitsola.

6. 
Goaltenders: Mike Curran, John Lothrop.
Defencemen: Bruce Riutta, Carl Lackey, Jim Branch, Bob Paradise, John Mayasich.
Forwards: Ron Nasland, Paul Coppo, Larry Pleau, Larry Stordahl, Bill Reichert, Gary Gambucci, Tim Sheehy, Keith Christiansen, Pete Markle, Jerry Lackey, Larry Skime.
Coach: John Mayasich (player-coach).

World Championship Group B (Yugoslavia)

East Germany was promoted to the 1970 Pool A tournament while Austria and Italy were demoted to Pool C.  Later, when Canada withdrew from international play, second place Poland was also promoted to fill their spot.

 –   4:2 (0:1, 2:0, 2:1)

28. February 1969 – Ljubljana

 –   11:1 (2:0, 4:1, 5:0)

28. February 1969 – Ljubljana

 –    3:3 (2:0, 1:2, 0:1)

28. February 1969 – Ljubljana

 –   4:1 (1:1, 2:0, 1:0)

28. February 1969 – Ljubljana

 –   13:4 (4:1, 5:0, 4:3)

1. March 1969 – Ljubljana

  –  6:2 (2:2, 2:0, 2:0)

1. March 1969 – Ljubljana

  –  2:1 (0:0, 2:0, 0:1)

2. March 1969 – Ljubljana

 –    9:1 (2:0, 3:0, 4:1)

2. March 1969 – Ljubljana

 –  11:2 (2:1, 4:1, 5:0)

3. March 1969 – Ljubljana

  –  5:0 (0:0, 1:0, 4:0)

3. March 1969 – Ljubljana

  –  5:2 (0:0, 2:1, 3:1)

3. March 1969 – Ljubljana

  –   2:1 (0:0, 1:0, 1:1)

3. March 1969 – Ljubljana

 –  5:4 (2:1, 3:1, 0:2)

4. March 1969 – Ljubljana

  –   1:6 (0:1, 1:0, 0:5)

4. March 1969 – Ljubljana

 –  3:1 (0:0, 2:0, 1:1)

5. March 1969 – Ljubljana

 –  1:4 (1:2, 0:0, 0:2)

5. March 1969 – Ljubljana

 –   11:3 (1:1, 7:1, 3:1)

6. March 1969 – Ljubljana

 –   5:1 (4:0, 1:1, 0:0)

6. March 1969 – Ljubljana

  –   5:1 (2:0, 1:1, 2:0)

6. March 1969 – Ljubljana

 –     4:4 (0:1, 3:3, 1:0)

6. March 1969 – Ljubljana

  –   3:3 (0:2, 2:0, 1:1)

8. March 1969 – Ljubljana

  –  8:0 (2:0, 2:0, 4:0)

8. March 1969 – Ljubljana

 –   5:2 (0:1, 0:0, 5:1)

8. March 1969 – Ljubljana

 –  4:1 (2:1, 1:0, 1:0)

8. March 1969 – Ljubljana

 –   10:2 (6:0, 3:2, 1:0)

9. March 1969 – Ljubljana

 –   3:2 (1:0, 1:1, 1:1)

9. March 1969 – Ljubljana

 –  5:4 (0:1, 2:3, 3:0)

9. March 1969 – Ljubljana

 –  1:6 (0:1, 0:4, 1:1)

9. March 1969 – Ljubljana

World Championship Group C (Yugoslavia)

Japan, and Switzerland were promoted to the 1970 Pool B tournament.  Later Bulgaria was elevated as well to fill the vacancy left by Poland.

 –  3:4 (0:0, 2:2, 1:2)

24. February 1969 – Skopje

 –   11:1 (3:0, 4:0, 4:1)

24. February 1969 – Skopje

  –    4:3 (2:0, 0:2, 2:1)

24. February 1969 – Skopje

 –   8:0 (2:0, 3:0, 3:0)

25. February 1969 – Skopje

  –  5:3 (2:1, 2:2, 1:0)

26. February 1969 – Skopje

 –  11:1 (1:1, 5:0, 5:0)

26. February 1969 – Skopje

 –  7:5 (2:2, 4:1, 1:2)

27. February 1969 – Skopje

 –    6:3 (0:1, 4:1, 2:1)

27. February 1969 – Skopje

 –    9:0 (3:0, 5:0, 1:0)

27. February 1969 – Skopje

 –    11:0 (5:0, 4:0, 2:0)

28. February 1969 – Skopje

  –  4:1 (1:0, 1:1, 2:0)

1. March 1969 – Skopje

 –  11:3 (5:0, 3:3, 3:0)

1. March 1969 – Skopje

  –  4:2 (1:1, 3:1, 0:0)

2. March 1969 – Skopje

  –   13:1 (5:0, 3:0, 5:1)

2. March 1969 – Skopje

 –   5:2 (3:0, 1:2, 1:0)

2. March 1969 – Skopje

Ranking and statistics

Tournament Awards
Best players selected by the directorate:
Best Goaltender:       Leif Holmqvist
Best Defenceman:       Jan Suchý
Best Forward:          Ulf Sterner
Media All-Star Team:
Goaltender:  Vladimír Dzurilla
Defence:  Jan Suchý,  Lennart Svedberg
Forwards:  Anatoli Firsov,  Václav Nedomanský,  Ulf Sterner

Final standings
The final standings of the tournament according to IIHF:

European championships final standings
The final standings of the European championships according to IIHF:

Notes

See also 
Czechoslovak Hockey Riots - developed as a direct result of the competition.

References
Summary (in French)

External links
IIHF World Ice Hockey Championships at SVT's open archive 

IIHF Men's World Ice Hockey Championships
World Championships
1969
March 1969 sports events in Europe
Cham
1960s in Stockholm
International sports competitions in Stockholm
Sports competitions in Ljubljana
1960s in Ljubljana
Sports competitions in Skopje
1960s in Skopje
1969 in Slovenia
1969 in the Socialist Republic of Macedonia
1968–69 in Yugoslav ice hockey
February 1969 sports events in Europe
International ice hockey competitions hosted by Yugoslavia